András Huszti (born 29 January 2001) is a Hungarian professional footballer who plays for Zalaegerszeg.

Club career
On 26 May 2021, Huszti joined Zalaegerszeg on loan for the 2021–22 season. On 16 June 2022, Zalaegerszeg made the transfer permanent and signed a three-year contract with Huszti.

Career statistics
.

References

External links

2001 births
Sportspeople from Pécs
Living people
Hungarian footballers
Hungary youth international footballers
Hungary under-21 international footballers
Association football defenders
Tiszakécske FC footballers
Puskás Akadémia FC players
Budafoki LC footballers
Zalaegerszegi TE players
Nemzeti Bajnokság I players
Nemzeti Bajnokság II players